Laetiporus baudonii is a species of polypore fungus in the family Fomitopsidaceae.

References

Fungal plant pathogens and diseases
baudonii
Fungi described in 1991